Steven Craig Harper (born 1970) is a professor of church history and doctrine at Brigham Young University. He was a historian for the Church History Department of the Church of Jesus Christ of Latter-day Saints. From 2019, he is the Editor-in-Chief of BYU Studies Quarterly.

Biography
Harper is a member of the Church of Jesus Christ of Latter-day Saints (LDS Church).  He served a mission for the LDS Church in Canada Winnipeg Mission.

Harper earned his B.A. in history from BYU in 1994. While a student at BYU he worked as an editorial assistant at BYU Studies in the compilation of the journals of William E. McLellin for publication. Harper earned an M.A. in American history from Utah State University in 1996, and a Ph.D. in early American history from Lehigh University in 2001. During his graduate studies Harper also took a summer seminar in Latter-day Saint history directed by Richard L. Bushman.

He taught history and religion at BYU-Hawaii from 2000 to 2001 and joined the faculty in the Department of Church History and Doctrine at Brigham Young University in Provo, Utah, in 2002.  Since that time he has also served as an editor of The Joseph Smith Papers, working on volumes in the Revelations and Translations Series and the Documents Series.

At the start of 2019 Harper became editor-in-chief of BYU Studies Quarterly.

Honors
1997 Grant recipient, Lawrence Henry Gipson Institute for 18th Century Studies, Lehigh University
1999 Juanita Brooks Award, Best Graduate Student Paper, Mormon History Association
1999 T. Edgar Lyon Award, Best Article of the Year, Mormon History Association
1999 Gest Fellowship, Haverford College Quaker Collection
2000 Dissertation Fellow, Lawrence Henry Gipson Institute for 18th Century Studies, Lehigh University
2002 Research Fellowship, Joseph Fielding Smith Institute for LDS History
 2007 Lawrence Henry Gipson Institute Guest Lecturer, Lehigh University
 2008 Class of '49 Endowed Young Scholar Award, Brigham Young University
 2009 Susan and Harvey Black Outstanding Publication Award, Church History and Doctrine, Brigham Young University
 2010 Joseph Smith Lecturer, Brigham Young University-Hawaii

Bibliography

Books 

Harper has also been co-editor of Prelude to the Restoration: Apostasy to the Restored Church with Fred E. Woods, Andrew H. Hedges, Patty Smith and Thomas R. Valletta. In 2010 Preserving the History of the Latter-day Saints that he co-edited with Richard E. Turley, Jr. was published. In 2012 Exploring the First Vision that he co-edited with Samuel Alonzo Dodge. In 2008 Regional Studies in Latter-day Saint Church History: The Pacific Isles that Harper co-edited with Fred E. Woods, Reid L. Neilson, Craig K. Manscill and Mary Jane Woodger was published.

Articles

Notes

Sources
BYU faculty website
Harper's publications with the Maxwell Institute

Goodreads review of Joseph the Seer
 Biography at Joseph Smith Papers Project website (accessed May 11, 2012)

1970 births
Latter Day Saints from Pennsylvania
American Mormon missionaries in Canada
Brigham Young University alumni
Brigham Young University faculty
Brigham Young University–Hawaii faculty
Lehigh University alumni
Living people
People from Blackfoot, Idaho
Utah State University alumni
Latter Day Saints from Utah